Ștefan Coidum (28 December 1930 – 27 February 2015) was a Romanian professional footballer and manager. Even if he did not have a long footballer career, playing only 10 years in a little over 60 Divizia A matches, Coidum impressed much more as a football manager. In his 35-year career, in which he trained 18 different teams, Ștefan Coidum earned its reputation as an expert of promotions succeeding no more than 6 promotions in the first league, with: CS Târgoviște, Brașov, ASA Târgu Mureș (2), Bihor Oradea and Maramureș Baia Mare. He also led Universitatea Craiova and Argeș Pitești in the European Cups.

Honours
CS Târgoviște
Liga II (1): 1980–81
Brașov
Liga II (1): 1983–84
ASA Târgu Mureș
Liga II (2): 1986–87, 1990–91
Bihor Oradea
Liga II (1): 1987–88
Maramureș Baia Mare
Liga II (1): 1993–94

References

External links
 romaniastats.wordpress.com
 labtof.ro
 
 

1930 births
2015 deaths
Romanian footballers
Romanian football managers
Liga I players
Liga II players
Unirea Tricolor București players
CSM Jiul Petroșani players
FCM Bacău players
FCV Farul Constanța players
FC Prahova Ploiești players
CSM Ceahlăul Piatra Neamț managers
CSM Reșița managers
CSM Jiul Petroșani managers
CS Universitatea Craiova managers
FC Bihor Oradea managers
FC Argeș Pitești managers
CS Corvinul Hunedoara managers
FCM Târgoviște managers
FC Brașov (1936) managers
FC Rapid București managers
FC Inter Sibiu managers
CS Minaur Baia Mare (football) managers
Association football midfielders